Middlebackite is an organic mineral with the formula Cu2C2O4(OH)2. It was first discovered within a boulder from the Iron Monarch quarry in South Australia in June 1990. Peter Elliott from the University of Adelaide, Australia, identified the structure of the mineral 25 years later. He determined its crystal structure through single-crystal X-ray diffraction using synchrotron radiation. Elliot named the mineral for the Middleback Range where it originated. In 2018 middlebackite was found in Val di Fiemme, Italy, during researches that brought to the discovery of a new mineral named fiemmeite.

Localities 
 Australia: Iron Monarch open cut, Iron Knob, Middleback Range, Eyre Peninsula, South Australia
 Italy: Passo di san Lugano, near Carano

References 

Organic minerals
Minerals described in 2019